Tuğba Danışmaz (born 1 September 1999) is a Turkish track and field athlete competing in the long jump and triple jump. She won the gold medal for the triple jump at the 2023 European Indoor Championships. Danışmaz claimed silver and gold at the 2019 and 2021 European Under-23 Championships respectively.

Danışmaz is the Turkish national record holder for the triple jump both outdoors and indoors.

Sports career
Tuğba Danışmaz competes for Enka SK in Istanbul.

She participated at the 2018 Balkan Athletics U20 Championships in Istanbul, Turkey, and placed fifth in the triple jump event.

Danışmaz competed in the long jump and triple junp events at the 2019 Turkish Athletics Super League's first leg in Bursa, and broke 12-year old triple jump national under-23 record with 13.80 metres. She won the silver medal in the triple jump event at the 2019 European Athletics U23 Championships held in Gävle, Sweden, improving her own Turkish U23 record.

Achievements

International competitions

Personal bests
 Long jump – 6.51 (Bursa 2022)
 Long jump indoor – 6.32 (Istanbul 2022)
 Triple jump – 14.09 (Tallinn 2021) 
 Triple indoor – 14.31 (Istanbul 2023)

National titles
 Turkish Athletics Championships
 Long jump: 2021, 2022
 Triple jump: 2019, 2020, 2021, 2022
 Turkish Indoor Athletics Championships
 Long jump: 2020
 Triple jump: 2022

References

External links 
 

Living people
1999 births
Turkish female long jumpers
Turkish female triple jumpers
Enkaspor athletes
European Games competitors for Turkey
Athletes (track and field) at the 2019 European Games
20th-century Turkish sportswomen
21st-century Turkish sportswomen
Athletes (track and field) at the 2022 Mediterranean Games
Mediterranean Games silver medalists for Turkey
Mediterranean Games medalists in athletics
Islamic Solidarity Games medalists in athletics